Jacques de Dinant was a medieval Bishop of Arras, France.

He was appointed bishop by Pope Innocent IV on 4 October 1247, and he resigned as bishop in 1259.He was also a considerable scholar of the 13th century. He was educated in Northern France or Holland and in the latter part of his life taught at the University of Bologna in the department of Rhetoric.

His works include:
 Summa Dictaminis 
 Breviloquium
 Ars Arengandi 
 Sex formulae dictaminis 
 Exordia in linea clericali and 
 Exordia in linea seculari.

References

Bishops of Arras
Roman Catholic monks
Year of birth unknown